The Josette Frank Award is an American children's literary award for fiction given annually by the Children's Book Committee at Bank Street College of Education. It "honors a book or books of outstanding literary merit in which children or young people deal in a positive and realistic way with difficulties in their world and grow emotionally and morally".

Known as the Children's Book Award from 1943 to 1997, it was renamed in honor of Josette Frank, the editor of many anthologies for children and a former Executive Director of the Child Study Association of America. The prize to the author of the book has been provided by the Florence L. Miller Memorial Fund. 

The Josette Frank Award is one of three prominent awards that the Children's Book Committee gives each year. The Flora Stieglitz Straus Award, established in 1994, is presented to "a distinguished work of nonfiction that serves as an inspiration to young people." The Claudia Lewis Award, given for the first time in 1998, honors the best poetry book of the year. The Margaret Wise Brown Board Book Award, is a biennial award, presented to published or adapted board books, will be presented in 2023 with books published in 2021-2022.

Winners

References

External links

Bank Street School of Education (home)

American children's literary awards
Awards established in 1943